The women's 200 metre backstroke swimming competition at the 2002 Asian Games in Busan was held on 4 October at the Sajik Swimming Pool.

Schedule
All times are Korea Standard Time (UTC+09:00)

Records

Results

Heats

Final

References 

2002 Asian Games Report, Page 217
Results

Swimming at the 2002 Asian Games